Gospel Trails is the sixth Sons of the San Joaquin album and the first distributed by Western Jubilee Recording Company/Shanachie.

Track listing

Personnel

Sons of the San Joaquin

Jack Hannah
Joe Hannah
Lon Hannah

Additional personnel

Mark Casstevens, Rich O'Brien - acoustic guitars
Rob Hajacos - fiddle
Joey Miskulin - accordion, organ
Craig Nelson, Jack Jezioro - acoustic bass
Ray Appleton - harmonica
Carl Gorodetzky, Pamela Sixfin - violin
Kristin Wilkinson - viola
Bob Mason - cello
Dave Hanson - string arrangements
Dale Evans Rogers - guest lead vocal, "In the Sweet By and By"

Production

Joey Miskulin - producer
Roger Glaspey - executive producer
Recorded at: 
B. Truitt Music, Nashville, TN
Brent Truitt - engineer
Musicwagon Studio, Nashville, TN
Joey Miskulin - engineer
The Roy Rogers-Dale Evans Museum, Victorville, CA (Dale Evans vocal track)
Dorn Calvano - engineer
Shane Anthony - engineer
Mixed at:
Musicwagon Studio, Nashville, TN
Dan Rudin - mixer
Joey Miskulin - mixer
Mastered at:
Georgetown Masters, Nashville, TN
Denny Purcell - mastering
Don Cobb - editing
Marc Blake - photography, front cover design
Dane Scott - Dale Evans photos
Jack Hannah - notes
Joan Pelosi - booklet design

External links
Official site

1997 albums
Sons of the San Joaquin albums